Innocent God is the seventh and final studio album by the progressive metal/rock band Magellan.

Track listing 
"Invisible Bright Man" - 6:20
"My Warrior" - 6:53
"Innocent God" - 9:22
"Found" - 6:56
"Who to Believe" - 5:15
"Sea of Detail" - 6:02
"Slow Burn" - 4:37

Credits
 Trent Gardner — vocals, keyboards
 Wayne Gardner — vocals, guitar, bass
 Robert Berry — drums, guitar, bass guitar, percussion

References

2007 albums
Magellan (band) albums